This is a list of people from Melbourne with some call to fame.

A Melburnian is an inhabitant of Melbourne, the capital city of Victoria, Australia. The word is a demonym.

Native Melburnians
The following were born or grew up in Melbourne.

#

 360 – hip-hop rapper

Back to top

A

 Daevid Allen – musician
 Gordon Allpress – darts
 Dennis Allen – criminal
 Vanessa Amorosi – entertainer
 Phil Anderson – cyclist
 Bobi Andonov – singer
 Peter Andre – entertainer
 Beau Anderson – darts
 Tina Arena – singer/entertainer
 Asphyxia – puppeteer and children's author.
 Tilly Aston – rights activist for the blind

Back to top

B

 Merril Bainbridge – local singer
 Dougie Baldwin – actor
 Mike Baird – bank manager, former NSW premier
 Eric Bana – comedian and actor
 Adam Bandt – politician
 Ron Barassi – Australian rules footballer
 Frederick Oswald Barnett – social reformer
 Jeremy Barrett – artist
 Max Barry – writer
 Kevin Bartlett – Australian rules footballer
 John Bertrand – yachtsman
 Travis Blackley – Major League baseballer
 Hamish Blake – comedian
 Cate Blanchett – actress
 Andrew Bogut – NBA basketball player
Jonah Bolden (born 1996) – NBA basketball player
 Anne Fraser Bon – pastoralist, philanthropist, and advocate
 Cris Bonacci – musician
 Leigh Bowery – performing artist
 David Boyd – artist
 John Brack – artist
 May Brahe – composer
 James Bailey – darts
 Mark Bresciano – soccer player
 Brigita Brezovac – IFBB bodybuilder
 David Bridie – musician
 Damien Broderick – science fiction writer
 Havana Brown – DJ/singer
 Jordan Brown (born 1996) – footballer 
 Emily Browning – actress/model
 Leigh Broxham – soccer player
 Stanley Bruce – prime minister of Australia
 Alice Burdeu – fashion model
 Debra Byrne – entertainer

Back to top

C

John Cain (senior) – premier of Victoria
Corey Cadby – darts
Anthony Callea – tenor/entertainer
Arthur Calwell – politician
Deirdre Cash (Criena Rohan) – novelist
Pat Cash – tennis player
Nick Cave – singer/actor
Brian Chambers – cricketer
Bianca Chatfield – netball player
Chris Cheney – musician
Anna Ciddor – author and illustrator
Gabriella Cilmi – singer
Mal Cuming – darts
Graeme Clark
Teale Coco – model
Steve Cox – artist
Vince Colosimo – actor
Kate Constable – novelist
Julie Corletto – netball player
Ryan Corr – actor
Peter Costello – politician, treasurer of Australia
Frank Costigan – lawyer and politician
Noel Counihan – artist
Susan Crennan – High Court justice
Barry Crocker – entertainer, children's TV personality
Bernard Curry – actor
Abraham Cykiert – playwright, poet

Back to top

D

Brody Dalle – singer
Tenille Dashwood ("Emma") – professional wrestler
Garry David – criminal
Liam Davison – novelist
Paul Dawber – actor, Neighbours, Sons & Daughters, The Novelist
 Tania de Jong - soprano and entrepreneur (daughter of Eva Duldig, granddaughter of Karl Duldig)
Emilie de Ravin – actress
Alfred Deakin – Prime Minister of Australia
Paul Dempsey – musician
Catherine Deveny – comedian
Anthony Di Pietro – businessman and soccer promoter
Helena Dix – soprano
Owen Dixon – chief justice
Jason Donovan – entertainer
 Eva Duldig (born 1938) – tennis player, author
 Karl Duldig (1902–1986) – sculptor
Sir Edward "Weary" Dunlop – surgeon and war hero
Judith Durham – entertainer (The Seekers)

Back to top

E

Sir John Eccles – Nobel laureate, neurophysiologist
Peter Eckersley – computer scientist, computer security researcher, and activist
Matthew Elliott – test cricketer
Jason Ellis – broadcaster
Mark Evans – bassist (AC/DC)
Dante Exum – NBA basketball player

Back to top

F

 John Farnham – entertainer
Brendan Fevola – Australian rules footballer
Jon Finlayson – actor and artist
John Fitzgerald – tennis player
Edwin Flack – tennis player
Flea (born Michael Balzary) – musician (Red Hot Chili Peppers)
Damien Fleming – test cricketer
Joel Fletcher – disk jockey
Debbie Flintoff-King – Olympic athlete
Amanda Fosang – biomedical researcher
Lindsay Fox – logistics CEO
Malcolm Fraser – prime minister of Australia
   

Back to top

G

Anna Galvin – actress
Alphonse Gangitano – organised crime figure
Zarah Garde-Wilson – attorney
Helen Garner – novelist
Andrew Gaze – professional basketball player
Lisa Gerrard – singer/composer
Sir John Gorton – prime minister of Australia
Gotye – musician
Alan J. Gow – motor sports promoter
Percy Grainger – composer/pianist
Germaine Greer – writer and feminist
Vince Grella – soccer player
Rachel Griffiths – actress
Savannah Guthrie – TV broadcaster currently working for NBC News

Back to top

H

 Joe Hachem – poker player
 Ross Hannaford – musician
 Frank Hardy – novelist and political activist
 Colin Hay – musician/actor
 Chris Hemsworth – actor
 Liam Hemsworth – actor
 Luke Hemsworth – actor
 Paul Hester (d. 2005) – musician
 Missy Higgins – singer, actress and entertainer
 Derryn Hinch ("The Human Headline") – broadcaster
 Peter Hitchener – news presenter (Nine News)
 Harold Holt – prime minister of Australia
 Danielle Horvat – actress 
 Rowland S. Howard – musician, writer and performer of the song (I Know) A Girl Called Jonny
 Merv Hughes – test cricketer
 Barry Humphries (Dame Edna Everage) – comedian
 Rex Hunt – Australian rules footballer and media personality
Graham Hunt – darts

Back to top

I 

 Kyrie Irving – NBA basketball player
 Steve Irwin – wildlife expert
 Isaac Isaacs – chief justice and governor-general of Australia

Back to top

J

Margaret Jackson – business executive
Christie Jenkins – trampoline athlete
Stephen Jolly – activist and politician
Alan Jones –  Formula One World Drivers' Champion
Dean Jones – test cricketer
Vance Joy – singer
Isha Judd – author and spiritual teacher
Paul Jennings – children's author

Back to top

K 

 Moira Kelly (humanitarian) – humanitarian aid worker
 Paul Kelly – musician
 Graham Kennedy – entertainer
 Marny Kennedy – actress/singer
 Jeff Kennett – premier of Victoria
 Jennifer Keyte – news presenter (Seven News)
 Graham Kinniburgh – organized crime figure
 Michael Klim – Olympic swimmer
 Michael Klinger – cricketer
 Barrie Kosky – opera director
 Lynne Kosky – politician
 Anthony Koutoufides – Australian rules footballer
 Tori Kewish – darts

Back to top

L

Norman Lacy – politician
John Landy – Olympic athlete
Elizabeth Langley – Canadian performer, choreographer, teacher
Lex Lasry – Supreme Court judge
Andrew Lauterstein – Olympic swimmer
Bill Lawry – test cricketer
Andy Lee – comedian
Michael Leunig – cartoonist and controversialist
Simon Lewis – lifeguard
Solomon Lew – businessman
Peter Lik – photographer
Walter Lindrum – billiards player
Luc Longley – NBA basketball player
Colin Lovitt – lawyer/QC
Richard Lowenstein – film director
Craig Lowndes – Three time Supercars Championship winner (1996, 1998, 1999)
Sydney Lucas – centenarian soldier

Back to top

M

Katie Mactier – racing cyclist
Melissa Maizels (born 1993) – soccer player
Costas Mandylor – actor
Daniel Mannix – Catholic archbishop of Melbourne
John Marsden – writer and educationalist
Kirstie Marshall – politician and aerial skier
 Mangok Mathiang (born 1992) - Australian-Sudanese basketball player for Hapoel Eilat of the Israeli Basketball Premier League
John McAll – pianist
Mat McBriar – American football punter
Frederick McCubbin – painter
Scott McDonald – Australian rules footballer
Hal and Jim McElroy – film/television producers
Brad McEwan – journalist (Ten Eyewitness News)
John Reid McGowan – boxer
Eddie McGuire – entertainer
Sir William McKie – musician
Sharelle McMahon – netball player
Noel McNamara – social activist
Peter McNamara – tennis player
Paul McNamee – tennis player and sports administrator
Bryony Marks - composer
Clement Meadmore – sculptor
 Dame Nellie Melba – opera singer
Ben Mendelsohn – actor
Keith Miller – test cricketer
Dannii Minogue – pop star
Kylie Minogue – pop star
Peter Mitchell – news presenter (Seven News)
Radha Mitchell – actress
Anika Molesworth – an agroecology scientist
Sir John Monash – civil engineer and military commander
Jason Moran – criminal
Lewis Moran – criminal
Mark Moran – criminal
Bob Morley – actor
Leslie Morshead – army officer and businessman
Dame Elisabeth Murdoch – philanthropist
Sir Keith Murdoch – journalist
Rupert Murdoch – press magnate
Vali Myers – artist and dancer

Back to top

N

Andrew Nabbout – soccer player
Bert Newton – entertainer
Matthew Newton – actor and son of entertainer Bert Newton
Olivia Newton-John – singer/actress
Livinia Nixon – TV presenter (Nine News)
Keith Nugent – physicist

Back to top

O

Joan O'Hagan – novelist
Ida Rentoul Outhwaite – illustrator
Scott Owen – bassist
Dermot O'Brien – film producer and director

Back to top

P

Roseanne Park (Rosé) – member of South Korean girl group Blackpink; raised in Melbourne
John James Parton – Big Brother UK contestant
Sid Patterson – track cyclist
Guy Pearce – actor
Andreja Pejic – model
Kirk Pengilly – musician (INXS)
Elliot Perlman – writer and barrister
Kath Pettingill – criminal (Pettingill family)
 Mark Philippoussis – tennis player
Oscar Piastri - formula 2 driver
Harry "Snub" Pollard – comedian
Bill Ponsford – test cricketer
Richard Pratt – businessman
Jane Price (1860–1948) – painter
Clifton Pugh – artist

Back to top

Q

Stephen Quartermain – news presenter, Ten Eyewitness News

Back to top

R

Raja Ram – musician
Diego Ramirez (artist) – artist
Dean Rankine – comic artist and writer
Chopper Read – criminal
Helen Reddy – singer and activist
James Mahmud Rice – sociologist
Jim Richards – racing driver
Steven Richards – racing driver
Robert Richter – lawyer and rights activist
William Ricketts – potter and sculptor
Gina Riley – comedian/actress
Neil Robertson – snooker player
Anastasia Rodionova – tennis player
Jodie Rogers – diver
Lionel Rose – boxer
Ruby Rose – actress
Normie Rowe – singer
Phil Rudd – drummer (AC/DC)

Back to top

S

Fred Schepisi – film director
Peter Scully – criminal
Anna Segal – Olympic freestyle skier and two-time world champion
Sam Sejavka – writer and musician
Phineas Selig – journalist
Mark Seymour – musician
Patricia Shaw – novelist
Ann Shoebridge – milliner
Peter Siddle – test cricketer
Ben Simmons – NBA basketball player
Peter Singer – philosopher
Jerry Skinner – deputy prime minister of New Zealand
Daryl Somers – entertainer
James Sorensen – actor/model
Jesse Spencer – actor/musician
Caitlin Stasey – actress
Christine Stephen-Daly – actress
Russell Stewart – darts
Craig Stott – actor
Graeme "Shirley" Strachan – singer (Skyhooks)/television presenter
Dane Swan – Australian rules footballer
Red Symons – guitarist, entertainer and radio presenter (774 ABC Melbourne)
Keith Sullivan – darts player

Back to top

T

Peter Tatchell – politician and rights campaigner
Don Tregonning – Australian professional tennis player and coach
Squizzy Taylor – criminal
Eliza Taylor-Cotter – actress
J. G. Thirlwell – singer/composer
Lewis Thorpe – professional baseball pitcher in the Minnesota Twins organization
John Thwaites – politician
George Tolhurst – composer
 Tones and I – singer and songwriter
Anna Torv – actress
Geoffrey Tozer – pianist
Zbych Trofimiuk – actor
Zoja Trofimiuk – sculptor
Anthony Troiano – musician
Christos Tsiolkas – author
Albert Tucker – artist

Back to top

V

Holly Valance – actress/singer
Mark Viduka – soccer player
Steve Vizard – entertainer and businessman
Karl von Möller – film maker and cinematographer

Back to top

W

Ron Walker – businessman and Lord Mayor of Melbourne
Stan Walker – singer
James Wan – film producer and director
Sir Joseph Ward – prime minister of New Zealand
Shane Warne – test cricketer
Gordon Watson (squash player)
Kathy Watt – Olympic cyclist
Matt Welsh – world champion swimmer
Leigh Whannell – actor/screenwriter
Jamie Whincup – racing driver
Christian Whitehead – game programmer
Ted Whitten – Australian rules footballer
Carl Williams – criminal
David Williamson – playwright
Richard Wilson – businessman and sports promoter
Ross Wilson – singer/songwriter
John Wren – businessman and underworld figure
Wayne Weening – darts 
John Weber – darts
Darren Webster – darts
Bruce Woodley – entertainer (The Seekers)

Back to top

X

Bohdan X – singer-songwriter

Back to top

Z

Feliks Zemdegs – Rubik's Cube speed solver

Back to top

Non-native Melburnians
These people were not born in Melbourne but are or were well known for living or working there.

A

Back to top

B

Courtney Barnett – singer-songwriter
Paula Bossio – author and illustrator
Steve Bracks – premier of Victoria
Frank Macfarlane Burnet – Nobel laureate virologist

Back to top

D

Portia de Rossi – actress

Back to top

F

Tim Ferguson – comedian

Back to top

G

Julia Gillard – prime minister of Australia
Delta Goodrem – actress/singer

Back to top

H

Brent Hobba – professional basketball player

Back to top

M

Sir Robert Menzies – prime minister of Australia

Back to top

N

Sir Gustav Nossal – Australian researcher

Back to top

P

Hoa Pham – writer and psychologist

Back to top

R

Christopher Raja – writer
Geoffrey Rush – actor

Back to top

S

Guy Sebastian – singer
Nevil Shute – novelist
Billy Slater – rugby league player
John J. Smithies – artist/arts manager
John So – Lord Mayor of Melbourne 

Back to top

T

Archie Thompson – soccer

Back to top

W

David Warren – inventor

Back to top

Y

James Yammouni – comedian (The Janoskians)

Back to top

See also

List of people from Adelaide
List of people from Ballarat
List of people from Brisbane
List of people from Darwin
List of people from Frankston
List of people from Fremantle
List of people from Rockhampton
List of people from Sydney
List of people from Toowoomba
List of people from Wagga Wagga
List of people from Wollongong

Back to top

References

Melbourne

Melbourne-related lists
Melbourne